Johannes Golla (born 5 November 1997) is a German handball player for SG Flensburg-Handewitt and the German national team.

He represented Germany at the 2020 European Men's Handball Championship. Since 2021, he's the captain of the German national team, succeeding Uwe Gensheimer.

Individual awards
All-Star pivot of the European Championship: 2022

References

External links

SG Flensburg-Handewitt profile 

1997 births
Living people
German male handball players
Sportspeople from Wiesbaden
Handball-Bundesliga players
Handball players at the 2020 Summer Olympics